This is a summary of the electoral history of John Major, who served as Prime Minister of the United Kingdom and Leader of the Conservative Party from 1990 to 1997. He was the Member of Parliament (MP) for Huntingdon from 1979 to 2001.

Council elections

1964 Lambeth London Borough Council election, Larkhall

1968 Lambeth London Borough Council election, Ferndale

1971 Lambeth London Borough Council election, Thornton

Parliamentary elections

February 1974 general election, St Pancras North

October 1974 general election, St Pancras North

1979 general election, Huntingdonshire

1983 general election, Huntingdon

1987 general election, Huntingdon

1992 general election, Huntingdon

1997 general election, Huntingdon

Conservative Party leadership elections

1990 leadership election

1995 leadership election

United Kingdom general elections

1992 general election

1997 general election

References

Major, John
John Major
Major, John